A Lord from Planet Earth is a trilogy of science-fiction novels by Russian writer Sergey Lukyanenko. Although predominantly science-fiction, the novels also include some elements of the fantasy genre. They are only available in Russian.

The trilogy consists of:
 A Princess Is Worth Death
 The Planet which Doesn't Exist
 Glass Sea

The initial draft of the first novel was written as a fantasy novel. However, Lukyanenko then decided that the science-fiction version was better. The fantasy draft was subsequently lost.

Science fiction book series
Novels by Sergey Lukyanenko
20th-century Russian novels